Chris Darby is an Auckland Councillor for the North Shore Ward and the chair of the Planning Committee. He is focused on public transport, urban regeneration and environmental issues. He is a progressive independent who is not affiliated to any political party. He ran on his independent ticket 'Taking the Shore Forward' in the 2013, 2016 and 2019 elections, and was elected each time.

Early political involvement
As a young man, Darby supported Ngāti Whātua's occupation of Bastion Point and was there on the day of the eviction on 25 May 1978. Before the "super city" merger of Auckland's councils into Auckland Council in 2010, Darby served on the North Shore City Council, being first elected in 2004.

Auckland Council

At the 2010 Auckland Council elections, Darby ran for the North Shore ward of Auckland Council for Shore Voice alongside Ann Hartley, who was elected. Darby finished 6th and was not elected to the council, but was elected to the Devonport-Takapuna Local Board for the 2010–2013 term.

At the 2013 Auckland Council elections, Darby ran for Council again and was elected as a Councillor for the North Shore ward, polling higher than both incumbents, George Wood and Ann Hartley. Wood remained Co-Councillor with Darby, given the North Shore ward elects two Councillors, however Hartley lost her seat to Darby, with whom she had campaigned on the Shore Voice ticket in 2010. Darby served his first term on the council with George Wood.

In the 2013–16 Auckland Council he was the Deputy Chair of the Auckland Development Committee and Infrastructure Committee, and is council's Political Urban Design Champion.

Darby was re-elected at the 2016 Auckland elections, with Richard Hills elected to serve with Darby. The new mayor, Phil Goff, appointed Darby the Chairperson of the Planning Committee. At both the 2019 and 2022 elections, Darby and Hills were re-elected.

References

Living people
Auckland Councillors
North Shore City Councillors
1950s births